Nicolò Niconisi (died 1541) was a Roman Catholic prelate who served as Bishop of Ston (1513–1541).

In 1513, Niconisi was appointed by Pope Leo X as Bishop of Ston. He served as Bishop of Ston until his death in 1541.

References 

1541 deaths
16th-century Roman Catholic archbishops in the Republic of Venice
Bishops appointed by Pope Leo X